Caelan Doris (born 2 April 1998) is an Irish rugby union player for URC and European Rugby Champions Cup side Leinster. He plays as a number 8 or flanker.

Early life and education
Doris was born in Lacken, Mayo to Dublin parents, his father Chris was a centre and also attended Blackrock College, final year 1980.

His first involvement with rugby was with Ballina. He attended boarding school from the age of 12 onwards at Blackrock College in Dublin, where he was a member of the victorious Leinster Schools Rugby Senior Cup team in 2014 as well as captaining the 2016 side.

Doris currently studies psychology at University College Dublin.

Rugby playing career

Leinster
After leaving school in 2016, Doris spent a year in the Leinster sub-academy before entering the academy in summer 2017. After a series of strong performances captaining the Ireland Under-20s, Doris was promoted two years early to Leinster's senior squad ahead of the 2018–19 season, after just one year in the academy, and having made his senior debut the previous season.

Ireland
Doris played for Ireland Under-20s in both 2017 and 2018, captaining them in the 2018 World Rugby Under 20 Championship. Despite a poor campaign from Ireland, he was one of the standout players of the tournament. He has 14 Ireland under-20 caps despite being injured for the entire 2018 Six Nations Under 20 Championship. 

Doris received his first call up to the senior Ireland squad for the 2020 Six Nations Championship, and made his debut when he started at number 8 in Ireland's opening fixture against Scotland on 1 February 2020, though a concussion meant that his debut lasted only four minutes. Doris missed the 2021 Six Nations and returned to play for Ireland in the summer and autumn internationals playing a starring role in Ireland wins against Japan, New Zealand and Argentina. Doris also scored his first tries for Ireland in the matches against New Zealand  and Argentina.

International tries 
As of 4 February 2023

Honours
Individual
Pro14 Young Player of the Year: 1 (2020)
Autumn Nations Series Player of the Series: 1 (2021)
Leinster
Pro14: 4 (2018, 2019, 2020, 2021)
Ireland
Six Nations Championship 1 (2023)
Grand Slam 1 (2023)
Triple Crown 2 (2022, 2023)

References

External links

Ireland Profile
Leinster Profile
Pro14 Profile

1998 births
Living people
People educated at Blackrock College
Rugby union players from County Mayo
Irish rugby union players
Leinster Rugby players
Ireland international rugby union players
Rugby union number eights
Rugby union flankers